The Barberton Magic Cities was a Minor League Baseball team that played in the Ohio–Pennsylvania League in 1905.  The Class-C team, based in Barberton, Ohio, was managed by Bill Feignley.  It is the only known professional team to be based in Barberton.

References

1905 establishments in Ohio
Baseball teams established in 1905
Defunct baseball teams in Ohio
Defunct minor league baseball teams
Baseball teams disestablished in 1905
Ohio-Pennsylvania League teams